Mir Jaffar Khan Jamali (1911 – 7 April 1967) was a prominent politician, tribal chief and an All-India Muslim League veteran from Balochistan province, Pakistan.

Early life and career
Mir Jaffar Khan Jamali was born in 1911 at Rojhan also known as Rojhan Jamali, Jhatpat area of British India.

He was an associate of Quaid-e-Azam Mohammad Ali Jinnah. He belonged to the Jamali tribe, a powerful and influential Baloch tribe. He actively participated in the struggle for the creation of Pakistan and independence of Pakistan in 1947. He also was an uncle and family leader of former prime minister of Pakistan Mir Zafarullah Khan Jamali who served as Prime Minister during Pervez Musharraf's regime. 
	
The district of Jaffarabad, Balochistan, is named after Jafar Khan Jamali.

Leader of Pakistan movement
Mir Jaffar Khan Jamali is widely considered to be one of the key leaders that made the idea of Pakistan popular in Baluchistan. In British India, Mir Jafar Khan Jamali led delegations of notable political figures from Baluchistan to the All India Muslim League's annual sessions in Madras (1939), Lahore (1940), Karachi (1941), Allahabad (1942), and Delhi (1943).

Commemorative postage stamp
Pakistan Post Office issued a commemorative postage stamp to honor him in its 'Pioneers of Freedom' series in 2007.

Mir Jaffar Khan Jamali Foundation
Mir Jaffar Khan Jamali Foundation (MJKJ-F) was founded in 1998 by a group of committed development workers and experts from backgrounds such as education, environment, water & sanitation, law, engineering, and women's activism. The foundation's vision was "A prosperous and progressive society where people have access to all basic amenities and facilities of life on equitable basis."
 	
MJKJ-Foundation committed to come forward and join hands with the poor communities, stop environmental degradation and facilitate the communities in improving their living, social, cultural and education conditions of the communities without any discrimination of ethnic background and religion.

Death
Jafar Khan Jamali died on 7 April 1967.

References

External links
southasiananalysis.org South Asia Analysis Group (Archived)

Jamali family
1911 births
1967 deaths
People from Jafarabad District
Leaders of the Pakistan Movement
Pakistan Movement activists from Balochistan